Lacabòn (or lecabòn) is a hand-crafted, traditional candy of Alessandria, Italy.

It is made in shape of a stick by kneading honey with sugar. 

It is sold on Saint Anthony's Day (17 January), and especially on Saint Lucy's Day (13 December) in the piazzetta of the same name.

External links 
 Article about lacabòn, with pictures of the preparation (Italian)

Alessandria
Cuisine of Piedmont
Candy